This is a list of association football clubs based in Switzerland, sorted by league and division within the Swiss football league system, as of the 2022–23 season. A total of 154 clubs compete in the top five tiers of the Swiss football pyramid, divided as follows:

Super League (top level with 10 clubs, fully professional)
Challenge League (second level with 10 clubs, fully professional)
Promotion League (third level with 16 clubs, mixed semi-professional and amateur)
1. League (fourth level with 42 clubs, comprising three regional groups with 14 clubs each, mixed semi-professional and amateur)
2. League Interregional (fifth level with 76 clubs, comprising five regional groups with 16 clubs in three groups each and 14 clubs in two groups each, amateur)

The Swiss football league system also includes clubs based in Liechtenstein. As of 2022, Liechtenstein has only seven clubs and no domestic league, though a domestic cup is organised annually. All clubs based in Liechtenstein therefore play in the Swiss league pyramid. Of those, only FC Vaduz competes in the fully professional levels of the Swiss league system, presently at the second level.

Super League

Challenge League

Promotion League

1. Liga

Fourth level, called 1. Liga, consists of three regional groups with 14 clubs each. Group 1 contains teams from western Switzerland, the area called Romandy, which is generally French-speaking. Group 2 contains teams from central Switzerland, which is mostly German-speaking. Group 3 contains teams from eastern Switzerland and Liechtenstein which contains German- and Italian-speaking regions.

Group 1

Group 2

Group 3

2. Liga

Fifth level, called 2. Liga, consists of five regional groups with 16 clubs in three groups each, and 14 clubs in two groups each. Group 1 contains teams from southwestern Switzerland. Group 2 contains teams from western Switzerland. Group 3 contains teams from west-central Switzerland. Group 4 contains teams from central and southern Switzerland. Group 5 contains teams from northern and eastern Switzerland along with teams from Liechtenstein.

Group 1

Group 2

Group 3

Group 4

Group 5

Alphabetical list

A
FC Aarau - Challenge League
FC Alle - (2. Liga IR)
FC Arbon 1905 - (2. Liga IR)
FC Amicitia Riehen - (2.Liga)

B
FC Baden - 1. Liga
Black Stars Basel - (2. Liga)
Concordia Basel - Challenge League
Excelsior Basel - (-)
FC Basel - Super League
Fortuna Basel - (-)
FC Nordstern Basel - (2. Liga IR)
BSC Old Boys Basel - (2. Liga IR)
FC Baulmes - 1. Liga
FC Bavois - (2. Liga IR)
FC Bazenheid - (2. Liga IR)
ES Belfaux - (2. Liga IR)
AC Bellinzona - Challenge League
FC Bern 1894 - (2. Liga IR)
Weissenbühl Bern - (-)
Young Boys Bern - Super League
FC Bex - (2. Liga IR)
GC Biaschesi - 1. Liga
FC Biel-Bienne - Challenge League
Floria Biel - (-)
SC Binningen - (2. Liga IR)
FC Balzers - (2. Liga IR)
FC Breitenrain Bern - (2. Liga IR)
FC Brugg - (2. Liga IR)
SC Brühl - (2. Liga IR)
FC Buelach - (2. Liga IR)
FC Bulle - 1. Liga
SC Bümpliz78 - (2. Liga IR)
SC Buochs - (2. Liga IR)

C
Etoile-Carouge FC - 1. Liga
SC Cham - 1. Liga
CS Chênois - 1. Liga
FC Chiasso - 1. Liga
FC Chur 97 - 1. Liga
FC Colombier - (2. Liga IR)
FC Cortaillod - (2. Liga IR)

D
SR Delémont - 1. Liga
FC Diepoldsau Schmitter - (2. Liga IR)
SC Dornach - (2. Liga IR)
SC Düdingen - 1. Liga
FC Dürrenast - (2. Liga IR)

E
FC Echallens - 1. Liga
FC Emmenbrücke - 1. Liga
USV Eschen/Mauren - 1. Liga

F
FC Frauenfeld - (2. Liga IR)
FC Freienbach - (2. Liga IR)
FC Fribourg - 1. Liga

G
Le Château de Lancy Geneva - (-)
La Châtelaine Geneva - (-)
FC Geneva - (-)
Racing Club Genève - (-)
Servette Geneva - Super League
Geneva United - (-)
Urania Genève Sport - 1. Liga
FC Gingins - (3. Liga)
SC Goldau - (2. Liga IR)
FC Grand Lancy - (2. Liga IR)
FC Grenchen - 1. Liga
FC Gumefens Sorens - (2. Liga IR)
FC Gspon - (-)

H
FC Hakoah - (5. Liga)
FC Herisau - (2. Liga IR)
FC Herzogenbuchsee - (2. Liga IR)
FC Hochdorf (-)
SV Höngg - 1. Liga

I
FC Ibach - (2. Liga IR)
FC Iliac - (-)

K
SC Kriens - 1. Liga
FC Kreuzlingen - 1. Liga
FC Küsnacht - (2. Liga IR)

L
Etoile Sporting La Chaux-de-Fonds - (3. Liga)
FC La Chaux-de-Fonds - Challenge League
FC Langenthal - (2. Liga IR)
Lausanne Football and Cricket Club - (-)
Montriond Lausanne - (-)
Racing Lausanne - (-)
FC Le Mont Lausanne - 1. Liga
FC Lausanne-Sport - Challenge League
La Villa Longchamp Lausanne - (-)
Villa d'Ouchy Lausanne - (-)
FC Liestal - (2. Liga IR)
FC Linth 04 - (2. Liga IR)
FC Locarno - (2.liga IR)
Losone Sportiva - (2. Liga IR)
FC Lugano - Super League
FC Luzern - Super League
FC Kickers Lucerne - (2. Liga IR)

M
AC Malcantone - (2. Liga IR)
Etoile Sportive FC Malley - 1. Liga
FC Martigny Sports - 1. Liga
FC Massongex - (2. Liga IR)
FC Mendrisio Stabio - 1. Liga
FC Meyrin - 1. Liga
FC Monthey - (2. Liga IR)
Montreux Narcisse - (-)
Montreux Sports - (2. Liga)
FC Moutier - (2. Liga IR)
FC Münsingen - 1. Liga
SV Muttenz - 1. Liga

N
FC Naters - 1. Liga
Cantonal Neuchâtel - (-)
FC Neuchâtel - (-)
Neuchâtel Xamax - Challenge League

O
FC Olten - 1. Liga

P
FC Paradiso - (2. Liga IR)
FC Perly Certoux - (2. Liga IR)
FC Plan Les Ouates - (2. Liga IR)
FC Portalban Gletterens - (2. Liga IR)
FC Porrentruy - (2. Liga IR)

R
FC Rapperswil-Jona - 1. Liga
FC Raron - (2. Liga IR)
SAR Rivera - (2. Liga IR)
CS Romontois - (2. Liga IR)
FC Küssnacht am Rigi - (2. Liga IR)

S
FC Sarnen - (2. Liga IR)
FC Savièse - (2. Liga IR)
FC Stade Lausanne Ouchy - (2. Liga IR)
Blue Stars St. Gallen - (-)
Brühl St. Gallen - (2. Liga IR)
FC St. Gallen - Challenge League
FC Schaffhausen - 1. Liga
SC Schöftland - (2. Liga IR)
FC Schötz - 1. Liga
Signal FC - (2. Liga IR)
FC Sion - Super League
FC Solothurn - 1. Liga
FC Stäfa - (2. Liga IR)
FC Sursee - (2. Liga IR)

T
FC Thun - Challenge League
FC Thalwil - (2. Liga IR)
FC Tuggen - 1. Liga

U
Union Sportive Terre Sainte - (2. Liga IR)

V
Maison Neuve Vevey - (-)
Vevey Sports - (2. Liga IR)
Veyrier Sports - (2. Liga IR)

W
FC Wädenswil - (2. Liga)
FC Wangen bei Olten - 1. Liga
FC Wettingen - (2. Liga)
FC Wil - Challenge League
FC Winterthur - Super League
VFC Winterthur-Veltheim - (see FC Winterthur)
SC Veltheim - (-)
FC Töss - (2. Liga)
FC Wohlen - Challenge League

Y
Concordia Yverdon - (-)
Yverdon-Sport FC - Challenge League

Z
SC Zofingen - 1. Liga
SC Zug - 1. Liga
American Wanderers Zürich - (-)
Anglo-American Club Zürich - (-)
FC Blue Stars Zürich (2. Liga)
FC Zürich - Super League
Fire Flies Zürich - (-)
Fortuna Zürich (-)
Grasshopper Club Zürich - Super League
FC International Zürich - (2. Liga)
Kickers Zürich - (-)
Neumünster Zürich - (4. Liga)
FC Seefeld Zürich - 1. Liga
SC Young Fellows Juventus Zürich - 1. Liga

External links 
 
 League table and results
 official site 

 
Switzerland
Football clubs
Football clubs